Iradelphic is the sixth studio album by electronic musician Chris Clark and the fourth one under the moniker Clark. It was released on 2 April 2012 on the Warp Records.

Track listing

References 

2012 albums
Clark (musician) albums
Warp (record label) albums